The Arzobispo Chacón Municipality is one of the 23 municipalities (municipios) that makes up the Venezuelan state of Mérida and, according to a 2007 population estimate by the National Institute of Statistics of Venezuela, the municipality has a population of 15,850.  The town of Canaguá is the shire town of the Arzobispo Chacón Municipality.

Demographics
The Arzobispo Chacón Municipality, according to a 2007 population estimate by the National Institute of Statistics of Venezuela, has a population of 15,850 (up from 15,586 in 2000). This amounts to 1.9% of the state's population.

Government
The mayor of the Arzobispo Chacón Municipality is Carlos Andrès Chacòn Mora, elected on October 31, 2004, with 61% of the vote.  He replaced Gerardo Duran shortly after the elections.  The municipality is divided into seven parishes; Capital Arzobispo Chacón, Capurí, Chacantá, El Molino, Guaimaral, Mucutuy, and Mucuchachí.

See also
Canaguá
Mérida
Municipalities of Venezuela

References

Municipalities of Mérida (state)